Grevillea anethifolia, commonly known as spiny cream spider flower, is a species of flowering plant in the family Proteaceae and is endemic to continental Australia. It is an erect shrub with hairy branchlets, lobed leaves, the lobes sharply pointed, and white to pale yellow or cream-coloured flowers.

Description

Taxonomy
Grevillea anethifolia was first formally described in 1830 by Robert Brown in his Supplementum primum prodromi florae Novae Hollandiae. The specific epithet (anethifolia) means "anise-leaved".

Distribution and habitat
Spiny cream spider flower grows in heath, shrubland and mallee, sometimes near creeks and occurs between Southern Cross, Lake Grace, Zanthus and Cape Arid in south-western Western Australia, on the Eyre Peninsula in South Australia and around Griffith in New South Wales.

References

Eudicots of Western Australia
anethifolia
Plants described in 1830
Taxa named by Robert Brown (botanist, born 1773)